Frederik Christoffel Hendrik "Frik" du Preez (born 28 November 1935) is a former South African rugby union player who represented Northern Transvaal and the Springboks. He was born on a farm near Rustenburg and went to school at Parys High School in Parys (Orange Free State). Du Preez mostly played in the flank or lock positions.

Du Preez made his test debut for the Springboks on 7 January 1961 in the flank position against England at Twickenham. He played his last test on 7 August 1971 at the age of 35 as a lock against Australia at the Sydney Cricket Ground.

Du Preez was an excellent all-round footballer, and like Australian lock John Eales, he was that rare phenomenon: a lock that could kick and even drop kick. Although he was not particularly tall, he was a tower of strength in the line-out. In addition he had a fantastic turn of speed and fine running skills with ball in hand, as he showed in the try he scored against the British Lions in 1968.

As an expression of the esteem that he is held in by South African rugby fans, Du Preez was named the country's rugby player of the 20th century.

References

External links

1935 births
Living people
People from Rustenburg
South African rugby union players
South Africa international rugby union players
Rugby union flankers
Rugby union locks
World Rugby Hall of Fame inductees
Afrikaner people
Rugby union players from North West (South African province)
Blue Bulls players